D. J. Eliot (born August 14, 1976) is an American football coach who is the linebackers coach for the Philadelphia Eagles of the National Football League (NFL). He previously served as the defensive coordinator and outside linebackers coach at Temple University and also served as an assistant coach at the University of Kansas, University of Colorado Boulder, University of Kentucky, Florida State University, Rice University, University of Tulsa, Texas State University, University of Miami, University of Houston and the University of Wyoming.

Coaching career

Early career
Eliot began his coaching career at his alma mater, the University of Wyoming in 1999. He then served as a graduate assistant at University of Houston from 2000 to 2001 and at the University of Miami in 2002.

Texas State
In 2003, Eliot was hired as the defensive backs coach at Texas State University. In 2004, he became their linebackers coach.

Tulsa
In 2006, Eliot joined the University of Tulsa as their linebackers coach.

Rice
In 2007, Eliot was hired by Rice University as their defensive line coach and recruiting coordinator.

Florida State
In 2010, Eliot joined Florida State University as their defensive ends coach. During his time there, Eliot helped guide them to a win in the 2013 Orange Bowl.

Kentucky
In 2013, Eliot was hired as the defensive coordinator and linebackers coach at the University of Kentucky under head coach Mark Stoops.

Colorado
In 2017, Eliot joined the University of Colorado Boulder as their defensive coordinator and linebackers coach under head coach Mike MacIntyre.

Kansas
In 2019, Eliot was hired by the University of Kansas as their defensive coordinator.

Temple
In 2022, Eliot was hired as the defensive coordinator and outside linebackers coach at Temple University under head coach Stan Drayton.

Philadelphia Eagles
On March 9, 2023, Eliot was hired by the Philadelphia Eagles as their linebackers coach under head coach Nick Sirianni.

Personal life
Eliot and his wife, Miekel, have one son, Dawson, and three daughters, Drue, Page, and Reace.

References

External links
 Philadelphia Eagles profile

1976 births
Living people
American football linebackers
Colorado Buffaloes football coaches
Florida State Seminoles football coaches
Houston Cougars football coaches
Kentucky Wildcats football coaches
Miami Hurricanes football coaches
People from Stillwater, Oklahoma
Philadelphia Eagles coaches
Rice Owls football coaches
Temple Owls football coaches
Texas State Bobcats football coaches
Tulsa Golden Hurricane football coaches
Wyoming Cowboys football coaches
Wyoming Cowboys football players